Up from Below is the first full-length album from Edward Sharpe and the Magnetic Zeros. It was preceded by Here Comes EP.

Commercial performance
As of July 4, 2013, the album has sold 363,000 copies in United States.

Track listing

In popular culture
 "Kisses Over Babylon" the music video appeared in 8th season of Beavis and Butthead in the episode "Bathroom Break".
 "40 Day Dream" was featured in a promo for season 5 of Mad Men and season 3 episode 6 of Chuck in Chuck Versus the Nacho Sampler
 "Janglin" was featured in a commercial for the 2011 Ford Fiesta.
 "Brother" was named after Ebert's good friend and famed actor Heath Ledger, who died in 2008. Ebert said in an interview with the BuildSeriesNYC in early 2020 that he and Ledger, the night before Ledger's death, were talking about a movie script concept where they are brothers, and one of them dies, and the spirit is with the other. Ebert talked about being stunned the next morning to find out Ledger had died. 
 "Home" was featured in a commercial for the NFL that focused on many cities and their home fans. It was used in the 2014 movie The Book of Life, in an episode of Community entitled "Debate 109", and in the season 1 finale of Raising Hope. "Home" was covered by the cast of Glee in the sixth-season episode "Homecoming". The commercial ubiquity of "Home" and other derivative pop folk songs eventually grew to frustrate Ebert.
 "Om Nashi Me" was featured in Andrew Reynold's part for the Emerica video "Stay Gold".

Charts

Certifications

References

External links
 Live on KCRW's Morning Becomes Eclectic
 On ABC's Amplified
 FuelTV Interview
 Live On FuelTV's The Daily Habit

2009 debut albums
Edward Sharpe and the Magnetic Zeros albums
Rough Trade Records albums
Vagrant Records albums